Sir Michael Myers  (7 September 1873 – 8 April 1950), also known as Mickey Myers, was the sixth Chief Justice of the Supreme Court of New Zealand from 1929 to 1946 and served occasionally as Administrator of New Zealand from 1930 to 1941. He was the first Jew to hold this position. He sat on the Judicial Committee of the Privy Council in 1936.

Born in Motueka, Myers was educated at Thorndon School and Wellington College, and gained his LLB from Canterbury College in 1897. Afterwards he was admitted to the Inner Temple.

Myers lived in Wellington. He went to the 1945 San Francisco conference that produced the United Nations, and participated in the drafting of the constitution of the International Court of Justice. He resigned on 6 September 1945, but was reappointed for one year, and then resigned on 7 August 1946. Myers died in Wellington in 1950, aged 76. He had been made King's Counsel in 1922, Knight Commander of the Order of St Michael and St George in the 1930 New Year Honours, and promoted to Knight Grand Cross of the Order of St Michael and St George in the 1937 Coronation Honours.

Family
On 2 August 1899 he married Estelle Miriam Salom (24 February 1876 – 11 May 1960), daughter of Maurice Salom, MLC of Adelaide, South Australia. There were two sons: Maurice Salom Myers (1900–1986) and Geoffrey Alexander Myers (1908–2002). Myer's sister Phoebe Myers was a notable educationalist, who represented New Zealand at the League of Nations in 1929.

References

External links
 Biography in the 1966 Encyclopaedia of New Zealand

1873 births
1950 deaths
Chief justices of New Zealand
People educated at Wellington College (New Zealand)
High Court of New Zealand judges
Members of the Judicial Committee of the Privy Council
New Zealand Jews
New Zealand Knights Grand Cross of the Order of St Michael and St George
20th-century New Zealand judges
People from Motueka
University of Canterbury alumni
New Zealand King's Counsel
New Zealand members of the Privy Council of the United Kingdom